Treason is a crime that covers a variety of extreme acts against one's sovereign or nation.

Treason may also refer to:

Film and television
 Treason (1933 film), an American Western directed by George B. Seitz
 Treason (1959 film), an Australian television film
 Treason (1964 film), a Greek drama directed by Kostas Manoussakis
 Treason (TV series), a 2022 spy drama

Literature
 A Planet Called Treason, a 1979 novel by Orson Scott Card that was reissued as Treason in 1988
 Treason: Liberal Treachery from the Cold War to the War on Terrorism, a 2003 book by Ann Coulter

Music
 Treason (band), an English rock band
 Treason (album), a 1977 album by Gryphon
 "Treason", a song by the Bats from Daddy's Highway
 "Treason", a song by Kutless from Sea of Faces
 "Treason", a song by M. Pokora from MP3
 "Treason", a song by The Teardrop Explodes from Kilimanjaro

See also
 High Treason (disambiguation)
 Traitor (disambiguation)